2874 Jim Young, provisional designation , is a stony Florian asteroid and slow rotator from the inner regions of the asteroid belt, approximately 7.5 kilometers in diameter. It was discovered on 13 October 1982, by American astronomer Edward Bowell at Lowell Observatory's Anderson Mesa Station near Flagstaff, Arizona. The asteroid was named after American astronomer James Young.

Orbit and classification 

Jim Young is a member of the Flora family, one of the largest groups of stony asteroids in the main-belt. It orbits the Sun in the inner main-belt at a distance of 1.9–2.5 AU once every 3 years and 4 months (1,228 days). Its orbit has an eccentricity of 0.13 and an inclination of 5° with respect to the ecliptic. A first precovery was taken at the Palomar Observatory in 1954, extending the asteroid's observation arc by 28 years prior to its official discovery observation at Anderson Mesa.

Physical characteristics 

In the SMASS classification, Jim Young is characterized as a stony S-type asteroid.

Slow rotator 

Jim Young is a slow rotator. These are bodies that take much longer to rotate once around their axis than most other asteroids typically do. In January 2007, a rotational lightcurve was obtained by American astronomer Donald P. Pray at his Carbuncle Hill Observatory. It gave a long rotation period of  hours with a brightness variation of approximately 0.75 in magnitude.

Diameter and albedo 

According to two different data sets from NASA's space-based Wide-field Infrared Survey Explorer with its subsequent NEOWISE mission, Jim Young  measures between 6.6 and 7.7 kilometers in diameter and its surface has an albedo between 0.190 and 0.251. The Collaborative Asteroid Lightcurve Link assumes an albedo of 0.24 – derived from 8 Flora, the family's largest member and namesake – and calculates a diameter of 7.5 kilometers with an absolute magnitude of 12.8.

Naming 

This minor planet was named for American astronomer James Young at JPL's Table Mountain Observatory near Wrightwood, California. At the time of citation, his numerous photometric observations significantly contributed to the number of then known rotation periods of asteroids. The official naming citation was published by the Minor Planet Center on 10 September 1984. Young is also a prolific discoverer of minor planets, credited by the Minor Planet Center with the discovery of more than 250 numbered bodies.

References

External links 
 Asteroid Lightcurve Database (LCDB), query form (info )
 Dictionary of Minor Planet Names, Google books
 Asteroids and comets rotation curves, CdR – Observatoire de Genève, Raoul Behrend
 Discovery Circumstances: Numbered Minor Planets (1)-(5000) – Minor Planet Center
 
 

002874
Discoveries by Edward L. G. Bowell
Named minor planets
002874
002874
19821013